Cynthia Felice (born October 12, 1942 in Chicago, Illinois) is an American science fiction writer. She is best known for her complex, carefully plotted stories and expansive universes.

Her first novel, Godsfire, and her first short story, "David and Lindy", were published in 1978. She and Connie Willis have co-written three novels. that are often considered young adult fiction, according to Willis.

Cynthia Felice is also a writing workshop enthusiast, and is considered an expert in many aspects of science fiction world-building. She has been included in several panels discussing future status symbols, dystopian fashion and next generation weapons.

Published books
 Godsfire (1978) Pocket Books 
 The Sunbound (1981) Dell Books 
 Eclipses (1983) Pocket Books 
 Downtime (1985) Bluejay Books/St. Martins Press 
 Double Nocturne (1986) Bluejay Books/St. Martins Press 
 The Khan's Persuasion (1991) Ace Books 
 Iceman (1991) Ace Books 

By Felice and Connie Willis
 Water Witch (1982) Ace Books 
 Light Raid (1989) Ace Books 
 Promised Land (1997) Ace Books

References

External links
 
 Cynthia Felice in The Encyclopedia of Science Fiction, 3rd. ed.
 Interview by Travis Heermann (2008)
 
 

1942 births
Living people
American science fiction writers
20th-century American novelists
20th-century American women writers
Women science fiction and fantasy writers
American women novelists
21st-century American women